Alicia Victoria Arango Olmos (b. 1 October 1958) is a Colombian politician and businesswoman, who served as the Minister of Interior and the Minister of Labor of Colombia. She was previously the private secretary of President Álvaro Uribe's Casa de Nariño and the nation's ambassador to the United Nations at Geneva.

Biography
She was the Chief of Staff and then assistant chief of staff of Coldeportes, and was later appointed deputy director of the Colombian Institute of Administration.

During the first term of Enrique Peñalosa as mayor of Bogotá, Arango was the director of the city's District Institute of Recreation and Sports.

Arango was appointed to replace Angelino Garzón as Colombia's ambassador to the United Nations, taking her office 9 June 2010.

In July 2015, Arango was appointed director of the Democratic Center Party, founded in 2013 by Álvaro Uribe.

References

Living people
1958 births
People from Cartagena, Colombia
Permanent Representatives of Colombia to the United Nations
Colombian women ambassadors
Women government ministers of Colombia
21st-century diplomats
21st-century Colombian women politicians
21st-century Colombian politicians
Democratic Center (Colombia) politicians
Female interior ministers